Ursula is a feminine given name in several  languages. The name is derived from a diminutive of the Latin ursa, which means "bear". The name has been rather uncommon in the English-speaking world, although its use has been influenced since the twentieth century by the Swiss-born actress Ursula Andress (born 1936).

Other forms of the name include:

 Orsolya is the variant form in Hungarian
 Úrsula is the variant form in Spanish (notice the acute accent)
 Uršula is the variant form in Bosnian
 Ursule is the variant form in French
 Uršulė is the variant form Lithuanian
 Urszula is the variant form in Polish

People
Saint Ursula (died 383)
Ursula, theoretical founding ancestor of Haplogroup U (mtDNA)
Ursula of Brandenburg, Duchess of Münsterberg-Oels (1450–1508), a princess of Brandenburg by birth
Ursula of Brandenburg (1488–1510), German noblewoman
Ursula Andress (born 1936), Swiss actress
Ursula Appolloni (1929–1994), Canadian politician
Ursula Bagdasarjanz (born 1934), Swiss violinist
Ursula Bloom (1892–1984), British novelist
Ursula Buckel (1925–2005), German soprano singer
Ursula Burns (born 1958), American businesswoman
Ursula Caberta, (born 1950), German politician, critic of the Church of Scientology
Úrsula Corberó, (born 1989), Spanish actress
Lady Ursula d'Abo (1917–2017); English socialite
Ursula Dubosarsky (born 1961), Australian writer
Ursula Engelen-Kefer (born 1943), German labor leader
Ursula Eriksson (born 1967), Swedish murderer accused of manslaughter in Britain
Ursula Fanthorpe (1929–2009), British poet
Ursula Franklin (1921–2016), Canadian metallurgist
Ursula Gauthier, French journalist
Ursula Gibson, American physicist
Uschi Glas (born 1944), German actress
Ursula Goodenough (born 1943), American biologist and writer
Ursula Hayden (born 1966), American professional wrestler, actress, and business woman
Ursula Haubner (born 1945), Austrian politician
Ursula Hegi (born 1946), American author
Ursula Herrmann (died 1981), German female murder victim
Ursula Kathleen Hicks, Lady Hicks (1896–1985). Irish economist and academic
Ursula Holden-Gill (born 1974), British actress
Ursula Howells (1922–2005), British actress
 Ursula Henderson, South Australian politician 
Ursula Jeans (1906–1973), British actress
Ursula Karven (born 1964), German actress 
Uschi Keszler (born 1948), German figure skater 
Ursula King (born 1938), German scholar of religion
Ursula Koch (born 1941), Swiss politician
Ursula Kübler (1928–2010), Swiss ballerina and actress
Ursula Ledóchowska (1865–1939), Austrian-born Polish religious leader
Ursula Lehr (1930–2022), German academic and politician
Ursula K. Le Guin (1929–2018), American author
Ursula von der Leyen (born 1958), German politician and current President of the European Commission
Ursula Martinez (born 1966), British writer and performer
Úrsula Micaela Morata (1628–1703), Spanish nun
Ursula Mommens (1908–2010), British potter
Úrsula Murayama, (born 1972) Mexican actress
Ursula Niebuhr (1908–1997), American theologian
Uschi Obermaier (born 1946), German model and actress
Ursula O'Leary (1926-1993), English actress
Ursula Plassnik (born 1956), Austrian politician
Ursula Pole, Baroness Stafford (c. 1504 – 1570), English noblewoman
Ursula Ratasepp (born 1982), Estonian actress
Ursula Reit (1914–1998), German actress
Ursula Rucker, American recording artist
Ursula von Rydingsvard (born 1942), American sculptor
Ursula Schäppi (born 1941), Swiss actress, playwright and comedian
Ursula Schleicher (born 1933), German politician and harpist
Ursula Southeil (1488–1561), English soothsayer
Ursula Stephens (born 1954), Australian politician
Ursula Vernon (born 1977), American artist and writer
Ursula Vaughan Williams (1911–2007), British poet
Ursula Moray Williams (1911–2006), British author
Ursula Wyss (born 1973), Swiss economist and politician

Fictional characters
Ursula, in the play Much Ado About Nothing by William Shakespeare
Ursula the Pig Woman, proprietor of a hot food stall and public lavatory, in the 1614 play Bartholomew Fayre: A Comedy by Ben Jonson
Ursula Brangwen, in the 1915 novel The Rainbow and the 1920 novel Women in Love by D. H. Lawrence
Úrsula Iguarán, in the 1967 novel One Hundred Years of Solitude by Gabriel García Márquez
Ursula Merkle, in the 1960 musical Bye Bye Birdie
Ursula, on the 1967 animated television series George of the Jungle and the 1997 live-action film adaptation of the same name
Ursula, in the 1989 Studio Ghibli film Kiki's Delivery Service
Ursula, from the 1989 Disney film The Little Mermaid
Ursula Buffay, in the 1990s television sitcoms Mad About You and Friends
Ursula, in the 1996 film Set It Off
Ursula, in the 1997 animated television series Pokémon
Ursula Hanson, a police dispatcher in the 2001 film Super Troopers
Ursula, in the 2003 video game Fire Emblem
Ursula, in the 2004 comic strip Brewster Rockit
Ursula Hartmann, from the 2006 anime/manga series Strike Witches
Ursula, in the 2006 video game Metal Gear Solid: Portable Ops 
Úrsula, in the 2006 television series Skimo
Ursula Beresford Todd, in the 2013 novel Life After Life by Kate Atkinson
Ursula, name given to Elizabeth and George Warleggan's daughter in the season 4 finale and fifth season of Poldark
Ursula Callistis, in the 2017 animated television series Little Witch Academia
Ursula, from Xenoblade Chronicles 2

References

English feminine given names
English-language feminine given names
German feminine given names
Estonian feminine given names